Senator Dutton may refer to:

Henry Dutton (politician) (1796–1869), Connecticut State Senate
Robert Dutton (born 1950), California State Senate